Tapuai Toese Ah Sam is a Samoan politician and former member of the Legislative Assembly of Samoa. He is a member of the Tautua Samoa Party.

He was elected to the Legislative Assembly in the 2011 Samoan general election. At the 2016 election the Salega seat was split. He stood in the Salega East constituency, but lost to Olo Fiti Vaai.

Following his retirement from politics he became a church pastor and moved overseas. In September 2022 he uploaded a video to YouTube in which he confessed to sexually abusing young girls.

References

Living people
Members of the Legislative Assembly of Samoa
Tautua Samoa Party politicians
Year of birth missing (living people)